Kasztelan is Polish for castellan and may refer to:

Titles
 Castellans of the Polish–Lithuanian Commonwealth

People
 Adrian Kasztelan, Polish footballer
 Krzysztof Kasztelan, Polish former footballer

Other
 Kasztelan (beer)
 Kasztelan (card game), a once-popular Polish card game
 Kasztelan (official), the man in charge of a castle